Allah-Yar Saleh (born Saleh Arani; 1897–1981) was an Iranian politician and diplomat who was Iranian Ambassador to the United States during Mohammad Mosaddegh's premiership.

Career
Allah-Yar Saleh was a member of the Iran Party, which was founded in 1946 as a platform for Iranian liberals and was one of the four main parties which made up the National Front. He was later made leader of National Front during 1960–1964.

Further reading

References

20th-century Iranian diplomats
Ambassadors of Iran to the United States
National Front (Iran) MPs
Iran Party politicians
1897 births
1981 deaths
Alborz High School alumni
Leaders of the National Front (Iran)
Members of the 16th Iranian Majlis
Members of the 20th Iranian Majlis